Meleti (locally ) is a comune (municipality) in the Province of Lodi in the Italian region Lombardy, located about  southeast of Milan and about  southeast of Lodi.

Meleti borders the following municipalities: Crotta d'Adda, Cornovecchio, Maccastorna, Castelnuovo Bocca d'Adda, Caselle Landi.

References

Cities and towns in Lombardy